The 2023 SMU Mustangs football team will represent Southern Methodist University in the 2023 NCAA Division I FBS football season. The Mustangs played their home games at Gerald J. Ford Stadium in University Park, Texas, a separate city within the city limits of Dallas, and competed in the American Athletic Conference (The American). They are led by second-year head coach Rhett Lashlee.

Previous season

The Mustangs finished the 2022 season 7–6, 5–3 in American play to finish in fourth place in the Division. They lost to BYU 24–23 in the New Mexico Bowl.

Schedule
SMU and the American Athletic Conference (AAC) announced the 2023 football schedule on February 21, 2023.

References

SMU
SMU Mustangs football seasons
SMU Mustangs football